Laura Künzler (born 25 December 1996 Berkeley, California) is a Swiss volleyball player. She is a member of the Women's National Team.
She participated at the 2017 Montreux Volley Masters, and 2018 Montreux Volley Masters.

Clubs 
2012 Volley Neuenhof
2012–2014 VBC Kanti Baden
2014–2017 Sm’Aesch Pfeffingen 
 2017-	Rote Raben Vilsbiburg

References

External links 
 CEV profile
 FIVB Profile
 http://www.chinadaily.com.cn/sports/2017-06/07/content_29651805_3.htm
 https://www.volleyball.ch/fr/federation/informations/news/news-detail/laura-kuenzler-le-cadeau-de-noel-du-volley-suisse-13079/
 http://www.bvbinfo.com/player.asp?ID=14760

1996 births
Living people
Swiss women's volleyball players
Sportspeople from Berkeley, California